The Forgotten Coast refers to a largely untouched and uninhabited area of coastline in the panhandle of the US state of Florida. The term, also a trademark, was first used in 1992, but the Forgotten Coast's exact location is not agreed upon.

Description 
The Forgotten Coast is a trademark first used by the Apalachicola Bay Chamber of Commerce on September 1, 1992.  The name is most commonly used to refer to a relatively quiet, undeveloped and largely uninhabited section of coastline stretching from Mexico Beach on the Gulf of Mexico to St. Marks on Apalachee Bay in the U.S. state of Florida. The nearest major cities are Tallahassee, about 90 miles northeast of Apalachicola, and Panama City, home of Tyndall Air Force Base, about 60 miles to the northwest.

The Tourist Development Council of Franklin County defines the Forgotten Coast as Franklin County itself. They add that the Forgotten Coast got its name "because it’s the last remaining stretch of unspoiled, pristine Gulf Coast beaches that haven’t been overrun by high rises and strip malls." In the council's definition of the Forgotten Coast, there are 200 miles of coastline, 5 islands, and nearly 100 historic sites, and it is a part of the Big Bend geographic region.

Communities 
In addition to the endpoints, it encompasses the coastal communities of (west to east):

 Port St. Joe 
 Cape San Blas
 Apalachicola
 Eastpoint
 Carrabelle
 Lanark Village
 Alligator Point
 Panacea
 Shell Point

These communities are located in the following counties, which by extension may be included in references to the Forgotten Coast by some writers:

 Gulf County, Florida
 Franklin County, Florida
 Wakulla County, Florida

The area is renowned for its oyster and shrimp production, marine wildlife, and fine white-sand beaches.  Peninsulas and barrier islands along the coast include:

Gulf County:
 St. Joseph Peninsula 
 Cape San Blas
Franklin County:
 St. Vincent Island
 Cape St. George Island
 St. George Island
 Dog Island

Protected natural and historic areas include:

 St. Joseph Peninsula State Park
 Apalachicola National Estuarine Research Reserve
 Prospect Bluff Historic Sites
 St. Vincent National Wildlife Refuge
 St. George Island State Park
 Tate's Hell State Forest
 Bald Point State Park
 Wakulla State Forest
 Edward Ball Wakulla Springs State Park
 San Marcos de Apalache Historic State Park
 St. Marks National Wildlife Refuge
 Tallahassee-St. Marks Historic Railroad State Trail

See also

Florida Panhandle
Emerald Coast, to the west
Nature Coast, to the east and south

References

External links

Regions of Florida
Gulf County, Florida
Franklin County, Florida
Bay County, Florida
Wakulla County, Florida
Gulf Coast of the United States
Coasts of Florida